Hedyscepe canterburyana, the big mountain palm or umbrella palm, is the sole species in the genus Hedyscepe of the family Arecaceae. It is endemic to Lord Howe Island, Australia and is threatened by habitat loss. It is a solitary palm with a distinct crownshaft, and bears unisexual flowers of both sexes. With the Rhopalostylis palms of Norfolk Island and New Zealand it forms the botanic subtribe Rhopalostylidinae. If differs from Rhopalostylis in minor floral details including having more than six stamens, and in being protandrous rather than protogynous. The two genera were formerly included in Archontophoenicinae until a recent revision (Dransfield, Uhl et al., 2005). In some (but not all) molecular phylogenetic analyses, Hedyscepe was found to be nested in the New Caledonia endemic Basselinia.

Description
It has a slender, close-ringed trunk, a prominent silvery crownshaft and a compact crown of dense, dark green, stiffly arching recurved fronds somewhat reminiscent of those of Howea belmoreana. The egg-shaped fruit are deep red when ripe, and about 4 cm long. They appear in densely bunched fruiting spikes from below the crownshaft. Each fruit contains a single seed.

Cultivation
Lord Howe Island has a subtropical climate. Summers are mild to warm with regular rain, and winters are wetter and somewhat cooler. Humidity averages in the 60 to 70 per cent range all year round.

With its arching fronds, H. canterburyana is a very attractive palm which is becoming increasingly popular among garden enthusiasts in cool subtropical and warm temperate climates. It is difficult to grow in the tropics or where nights are never cool, but does well in climates like Sydney and Auckland, and can tolerate the occasional light frost once established. It needs a rich organic soil, and shelter from sun for at least the first five years. It also does well in containers or as indoor plants where light is good. Single plants are capable of producing fertile seed. Fresh seed is slow and erratic in germination, with seedlings appearing from five to 18 months after they are sown. Fruit take up to four years to ripen and it is not easy to tell when the seeds are ripe.

Sources
Dransfield, John, Natalie W Uhl, Conny B Asmussen, William J Baker, Madeline M Harley, and Carl E Lewis 2005. 'A new phylogenetic classification of the palm family, Arecaceae'. Kew Bulletin, Vol. 60 (2005).
 Jones, David L. 1995. Palms Throughout the World. Smithsonian Institution Press, Washington D.C.
 Jones, David L. 1996. Palms in Australia. Reed Books, Melbourne.
 Krempin, Jack 1990. Palms & Cycads Around The World. Herron Books, Fortitude Valley, Queensland.
Uhl, Natalie W. and Dransfield, John 1987. Genera Palmarum - A classification of palms based on the work of Harold E. Moore. Allen Press, Lawrence, Kansas.  / .

Notes

External links

PACSOA

Rhopalostylidinae
Palms of Australia
Vulnerable flora of Australia
Endemic flora of Lord Howe Island
Monotypic Arecaceae genera
Taxonomy articles created by Polbot
Taxa named by Carl Georg Oscar Drude